The Federal Reserve Bank of Minneapolis, located in Minneapolis, Minnesota, in the United States, covers the 9th District of the Federal Reserve, which is made up of Minnesota, Montana, North and South Dakota, northwestern Wisconsin, and the Upper Peninsula of Michigan. Although its geographical territory is the third largest of the 12 Federal Reserve banks, it serves the smallest population base of the system. It has one branch, which is in Helena, Montana.

Staff 

The bank has a staff of over 1000 people.

Neel Kashkari became the bank's president on January 1, 2016; succeeding Narayana Kocherlakota. The Minneapolis Fed has strong ties to the economics department at the University of Minnesota. Nobel laureate economist Edward Prescott was affiliated with both institutions for a long time. The Bank publishes The Region, a magazine featuring articles about economic policy and interviews with famous economists.

Bank buildings

Three buildings have served as headquarters for the district, all within a few blocks of each other. All three buildings are standing and in use as of 2019.

1915–1973

The first building for the Minneapolis Federal Reserve bank is located at 510 Marquette Avenue, at the corner of Marquette Avenue and 5th Street South in Minneapolis, right next to the Nicollet Mall station of the METRO Blue and Green light rail lines, and across from the Soo Line Building. It was designed by Cass Gilbert, architect of the Minnesota State Capitol building. It was completed in 1915. The building was unusual in that there were no windows on the lower walls close to the street—from the start, large bricks filled in the spaces where windows would be expected. Only up at the top was anyone able to look out from the building. The structure only became more strange in the 1950s, when a small skyscraper eight stories tall was added on top. The modern superstructure clashed with the granite Roman columns on the building's façade.

After the Fed moved to its second building in 1973, the new owner, a partnership of New York developers, Peter V. Tishman and Jay Marc Schwamm, had the lower portion covered with something that was a better match to the skyscraper "hat" on top. The , windowless, lower floors were stripped of the granite and replaced with a "bird cage" limestone facade (designed by Minneapolis architect Robert Cerny) and a totally artificially sustained natural  garden of ficus trees and pools of water (designed by San Francisco landscape architectural firm of Lawrence Halprin). At the time it was the largest totally artificially sustained garden within an office building in the United States; it had been modeled after the Ford Foundation Building in New York City, which has a larger garden, but also one that relies to some extent on outside natural light. There was also the need to remove the interior, independently supported five-story vault so that the building could be connected to the adjacent F&M Bank Building, and also become part of the second floor, Minneapolis Skyway System. After a three-year development the National City Bank of Minneapolis (now part of M&I Bank) moved into the building as its principal tenant. After the renovation, the building received the Minneapolis Committee on the Urban Environment award for contributed the most to Minneapolis's urban environment.

In 2013, the 510 Marquette building was sold for $6.69 million. At the time it was reported to have 198,552 square feet. It was purchased by Marquette Partners LLC, an affiliate of Minneapolis-based Swervo Development. The seller was OP2 Marquette, an affiliate of Opportunity Advisors of Eden Prairie, Minnesota. Opportunity Advisors had purchased the building in May 2012 for somewhere around $5-$6 million, about one-fourth of its 1998 selling price.

1973–1997

The Federal Reserve moved two blocks away on Marquette Avenue to a building now known as Marquette Plaza, which is constructed much like a suspension bridge with cables strung between pillars at the ends carrying the load.  It is noted as the first (and perhaps only) building ever made to use catenary support. Design problems, along with asbestos contamination, led the Federal Reserve to decide to move into a new complex and sell the old structure. The new owner rehabilitated the building and added on, and the building temporarily housed the central Minneapolis Public Library while its new building was under construction. The building was designed to accommodate another cable to complete the circle, which was never built.

1997–present
Designed by architecture firm HOK, a complex along the Mississippi River now serves as home to the Minneapolis Fed, which moved there in 1997. The address was set as 90 Hennepin Avenue to match the 9th district designation. It is located on the site of the former Minneapolis Great Northern Depot adjacent to the Hennepin Avenue Bridge and the Pacific sawmill once owned by T. B. Walker and George A. Camp.

Board of directors

The following people are on the board of directors . Class A directors are elected by member banks to represent member banks. Class B directors are elected by member banks to represent the public. Class C directors are appointed by the Board of Governors to represent the public. Their terms expire on December 31.

Court cases

See also

 Federal Reserve Act
 Federal Reserve System
 Federal Reserve Districts
 Federal Reserve Branches
 Federal Reserve Bank of Minneapolis Helena Branch
 Structure of the Federal Reserve System

Notes

External links
Minneapolis Fed's home page
James Lileks: Federal Reserve
Public Statements of Presidents of the Federal Reserve Bank of Minneapolis
Annual Report to the Directors of the Federal Reserve Bank of Minneapolis, 1915-1956
Annual Report of the Federal Reserve Bank of Minneapolis, 1915-1998, 2000-current

Minneapolis
Economy of Minneapolis
Economy of the Midwestern United States